Andrew W. Houston (born March 4, 1983) is an American Internet entrepreneur, and the co-founder and CEO of Dropbox, an online backup and storage service. According to Forbes, his net worth is about $2.2 billion. Houston held 24.4 percent voting power in Dropbox before filing for IPO in February 2018.

Early life

Houston was born in Acton, Massachusetts in 1983.  He attended Acton-Boxborough Regional High School in the 1990s. He later graduated with a degree in Computer Science from the Massachusetts Institute of Technology (MIT), where he was a member of the Phi Delta Theta fraternity. It was there that he met Arash Ferdowsi who would later go on to be co-founder and CTO of Dropbox.

During his time in college, Houston co-founded a SAT prep company.

Career
Houston and Ferdowsi co-founded Dropbox in 2007. Houston currently is CEO and 25% owner of Dropbox.

In February 2020, Houston joined the board of directors of Facebook, replacing Netflix CEO Reed Hastings, who left in May 2019.

Accolades

Houston was named one of the "most promising players aged 30 and under" by Business Week, and Dropbox has been touted as Y Combinator's most successful investment to date. Houston was also named among the top 30 under-30 entrepreneurs by inc.com, and Dropbox has been called one of the 20 best startups of Silicon Valley.

In June 2013, MIT invited Houston to serve as speaker at its annual commencement ceremonies. In his remarks, Houston gave this advice:

Personal life
Houston lives in Austin, Texas.

In April 2013, a lobbying group called FWD.us (aimed at lobbying for immigration reform and improvements to education) was launched, with Houston listed as one of the founders.

In 2016, he endorsed Hillary Clinton in the 2016 United States presidential election.

References

1983 births
Living people
American computer businesspeople
American computer scientists
Businesspeople from Massachusetts
Businesspeople in information technology
MIT School of Engineering alumni
American technology company founders
American technology chief executives
Y Combinator people
American billionaires
People from Acton, Massachusetts
Directors of Facebook